The 2022 Valparaiso Beacons football team represented Valparaiso University  as a member of the Pioneer Football League (PFL) during the 2022 NCAA Division I FCS football season. They were led by fourth-year head coach Landon Fox and played their home games at Brown Field in Valparaiso, Indiana.

Previous season

The Beacons finished the 2021 season 4–7, 4–4 in PFL play to finish in seventh place.

Schedule

Game summaries

Indiana Wesleyan

at Illinois State

at Dartmouth

San Diego

at Presbyterian

Butler

at Morehead State

at Dayton

St. Thomas (MN)

at Marist

Drake

at New Mexico State

References

Valparaiso
Valparaiso Beacons football seasons
Valparaiso Beacons football